Iglesia de la Concepción may refer to:

 Iglesia de la Concepción (Santa Cruz de Tenerife)
 Iglesia de la Concepción (San Cristóbal de La Laguna)